Methlick (Gaelic: Maothulach) is a village in the Formartine area of Aberdeenshire, Scotland, situated on the River Ythan  north-west of Ellon.

Services 
Methlick is served by a parish church, a general store, a garage and hardware store, one hotel and a village hall. Methlick village also features a recently renovated play park in 2013 providing a range of play equipment for all ages.

Transport 
The village is situated at the intersection of the B9005 road from Ellon to Fyvie and the B9170 road from Inverurie to New Deer, both routes crossing the River Ythan at Methlick Bridge.

Methlick is served by regular bus services to Aberdeen and less frequent services linking to Ellon, Fyvie and Inverurie.

Community 
Methlick Community Council represents local views to the principal local authority, Aberdeenshire Council.

A community web site gives local information, news and events:  http://methlick.wordpress.com/

Places of interest 

Sport 
Methlick has a cricket team which is a member of the Aberdeenshire Cricket Association. The MCC plays at Lairds, in the heart of the village next to the river Ythan.

Methlick football team compete in the Buchan Welfare Football League. They won both the league and the league cup in 2009, the club's most successful achievement in 10 years.

References

Villages in Aberdeenshire